This is a list of archives in Switzerland.

Archives in Switzerland 
Bibliothèque de Genève - Département des manuscrits et des archives privées
Federal Archives of Switzerland
International Committee of the Red Cross archives
Swiss Film Archive
Swiss Social Archives

See also 

 List of archives
 List of libraries in Switzerland
 List of museums in Switzerland

Further reading
 

Archives in Switzerland
Switzerland
Archives
Archives